Maynard James Keenan is best known as the lead singer of rock band Tool, with whom he has recorded five studio albums and earned three Grammy Awards, and A Perfect Circle, with whom he has recorded four studio albums. Puscifer, a side project created by Keenan, has released three studio albums.

Album appearance

With TexA.N.S.
 Live at Sons and Daughters Hall (1986)
 Never Again (1986)

With Children of the Anachronistic Dynasty
Fingernails (1986)
Dog House (1987)
Peace Day (VHS release, 1987)

With Tool

Studio albums

Other

!style="width:2em;font-size:75%"| US
!style="width:2em;font-size:75%"| AUS
!style="width:2em;font-size:75%"| CAN
!style="width:2em;font-size:75%"| NZ
!style="width:2em;font-size:75%"| UK

With A Perfect Circle

Studio albums

With Puscifer

Studio albums

Other

Collaborations

Other credits

References

External links
 

Heavy metal discographies